The 2019 season was Tromsø's fifth season in the Tippeligaen following their relegation at the end of the 2013 and their 32nd season in the top flight of Norwegian football. Tromsø finished the season in 15th position, earning relegation back to the 1. divisjon, whilst also reaching the Third Round of the Norwegian Cup where they were knocked out by Kongsvinger.

Squad

Out on loan

Transfers

Winter

In:

Out:

Summer

In:

Out:

Competitions

Eliteserien

Results summary

Results by round

Results

Table

Norwegian Cup

Squad statistics

Appearances and goals

|-
|colspan="14"|Players away from Tromsø on loan:

|-
|colspan="14"|Players who left Tromsø during the season:
|}

Goal scorers

Disciplinary record

References

Tromsø IL seasons
Tromsø